Montagnard Foundation, Inc. is an anti-communist organization whose mission statement is to protect the rights of the Montagnard people. It is a non-profit organization, founded in 1990 and based in South Carolina in the United States, that has spoken out against Vietnam's policies that affect the Montagnard people. During the Vietnam War it is estimated that some 40,000 Montagnards served with the US military as scouts, interpreters and soldiers. The foundation claims that over 200,000 Montagnards perished during the conflict.

The Montagnard Foundation is led by exiled leader Kok Ksor who is a member of Transnational Radical Party and has brought the persecution of the Montagnard people to the platform of the Unrepresented Nations and Peoples Organisation. The Foundation states that its goal is to protect the rights, preserve the lives and the culture of the Montagnard people through nonviolent means and not in an independent state.

History

References

 Sidney Jones, Malcolm Smart, Joe Saunders, HRW. (2002). Repression of Montagnards: Conflicts Over Land and Religion in Vietnam's Central Highlands, Human Rights Watch. .
 United States Congress. Senate. Committee on Foreign. (1998). The Plight of the Montagnards: Hearing Before the Committee on Foreign Relations, United States Relations, Original from the Library of Congress.
Report of the Special Rapporteur on the situation of human rights and fundamental freedoms of indigenous people by Rodolfo Stavenhagen for United Nations Commission on Human Rights  6 March 2002. Submitted pursuant to Commission resolution 2001/57 Addendum. Selected summaries of communications examined by the Special Rapporteur in 2001/2002

External links
The Degar Foundation, Inc.
Montagnard Human Rights Organization (MHRO)
Save The Montagnard People, a website dedicated to aiding Degar refugees and their descendants in the United States, primarily supported by American Vietnam veterans
Repression of Montagnards: Conflicts over Land and Religion in Vietnam's Central Highlands by Human Rights Watch April 2002
Montagnards Face Religious, Political Persecution by Human Rights Watch June 2006

Politics of Vietnam
Anti-communism in Vietnam
Anti-communist organizations in the United States
1990 establishments in South Carolina
Members of the Unrepresented Nations and Peoples Organization